KGpg is a graphical frontend to GnuPG for KDE, which includes a key management window and an editor.  Users can easily create cryptographic keys, and write, encrypt, decrypt, sign, or verify messages.  Through integration with the Konqueror browser/file manager, users can easily encrypt files by right-clicking and choosing Actions > Encrypt File.  Left-clicking on an encrypted file in Konqueror will prompt the user for a password to decrypt the file. You can make public or private keys, and can export/import keys. A user can sign the keys, and set an expiration date.

References 

KDE Applications